

V Curve
In power engineering & electrical engineering, V curve is the graph showing the relation of armature current as a function of field current in synchronous machines keeping the load constant. The purpose of the curve is to show the variation in the magnitude of the armature current as the excitation voltage of the machine is varied.

Inverted V Curve
The Inverted V Curve is a graph showing the relation of power factor as a function of field current.

See also
 Synchronous motor

References
Saadat, Hadi. 2004. Power Systems Analysis. 2nd Ed. McGraw Hill. International Edition.

Electrical generators
Synchronous machines